Meredith Etherington-Smith (née Dups, 1946 – 25 January 2020) was a British fashion and art journalist and biographer.

She was born in Wales in 1946, and grew up in Kent. She attended the Royal College of Art.

Her career as a journalist began in the 1960s, and by the 1970s she was London editor for Vogue Paris and for a year the only female editor of the American men's magazine GQ. After relocating back to London in the early 1980s, she wrote for a wide range of publications including The Times, The Daily Telegraph, and The New York Times, before taking the post of Deputy and Featured editor at Harpers & Queen in 1983. As a representative of the magazine, she was the fashion journalist asked to choose the Dress of the Year for 1994, for which she picked a black bias-cut strapless dress by John Galliano.

By the early 1990s, Etherington-Smith was established as an art journalist. She was a founder of Art Fortnight, and has been an editor of ArtReview. In 2006 she was editor-in-chief of Christie's Magazine and the London editor of Artinfo.com. Whilst at Christie's, Etherington-Smith worked with Diana, Princess of Wales regarding the charity auction of her clothes in 1997, and also curated the 1999 sale of Marilyn Monroe's clothing and personal effects and the 2011 auction of Elizabeth Taylor's wardrobe and jewels.

As a biographer Etherington-Smith has written about the fashion designer Lucy, Lady Duff-Gordon and her sister, novelist Elinor Glyn in The "It" Girls; and about Salvador Dalí in The Persistence of Memory, which was translated into twelve languages.

Etherington-Smith died from a heart attack in January 2020 at the age of 73.

References

1946 births
2020 deaths
British women journalists
English fashion journalists
Alumni of the Royal College of Art
British magazine editors
Fashion editors
Harper's Bazaar
Women magazine editors